Diego Galeano may refer to:

 Diego Galeano (footballer) (born 1986), Argentine professional footballer
 Diego Galeano (tennis) (born 1992), Paraguayan professional tennis player